"In Heaven There Is No Beer" is a song about the existential pleasures of beer drinking. The title of the song states a reason for drinking beer while you are still alive. The song in German is "Im Himmel gibt's kein Bier", in Spanish, "En El Cielo No Hay Cerveza". It was originally composed as a movie score for the film Die Fischerin vom Bodensee, 1956, by Ernst Neubach and Ralph Maria Siegel. The English lyrics are credited to Art Walunas.

Atongo Zimba recorded a version as well as Clean Living.  The song was the inspiration for the title of the 1984 film and 1985 Sundance Film Festival winner, In Heaven There Is No Beer?, which also featured the song "Who Stole the Kishka?".

A version of the song by the Amherst, Massachusetts, band Clean Living became a hit in 1972 (US Billboard #49, Cash Box #34; Canada #51).

References

Drinking songs
Polkas
1956 songs
German songs
American college songs
Songs about alcohol
Works about beer